Oberammergau station is a railway station in the municipality of Oberammergau, in Bavaria, Germany. It is the southern terminus of the Ammergau Railway of Deutsche Bahn.

Services
 the following services stop at Oberammergau:

 RB: hourly service to

References

External links
 
 Oberammergau layout 
 

Railway stations in Bavaria
Buildings and structures in Garmisch-Partenkirchen (district)